The 1993 Paris–Nice was the 51st edition of the Paris–Nice cycle race and was held from 7 March to 14 March 1993. The race started in Fontenay-sous-Bois and finished at the Col d'Èze. The race was won by Alex Zülle of the ONCE team.

General classification

References

1993
1993 in road cycling
1993 in French sport
March 1993 sports events in Europe